The 1995 Kentucky Wildcats football team represented the University of Kentucky in the Southeastern Conference (SEC) during the 1995 NCAA Division I-A football season.  In their sixth season under head coach Bill Curry, the Wildcats compiled a 4–7 record (2–6 against SEC opponents), finished in fifth place in the Eastern Division of the SEC, and were outscored by their opponents, 269 to 223.  The team played its home games in Commonwealth Stadium in Lexington, Kentucky.

The team's statistical leaders included Billy Jack Haskins with 1,176 passing yards, Moe Williams with 1,600 rushing yards, and Craig Yeast with 337 receiving yards.

Schedule

References

Kentucky
Kentucky Wildcats football seasons
Kentucky Wildcats football